Connie Francis Sings Spanish and Latin American Favorites is a studio album of Spanish and Latin American songs recorded by American entertainer Connie Francis.

Background
After the success of her 1959 album Connie Francis Sings Italian Favorites (which remained on the albums chart for 81 weeks and peaked at No. 4), Francis released more albums which appealed to immigrants in the United States.

In July 1960, Francis was in Hollywood for the interior shots of her first motion picture Where the Boys Are which made it impossible for her to record the album during live sessions at EMI's famous Abbey Road Studios in London as she had done with Connie Francis sings Italian Favorites. Hence, the playbacks to these songs were pre-recorded in London under the supervision of Francis' British producer Norman Newell and were conducted by Geoff Love. The tapes containing these playbacks were shipped to Hollywood, where Francis overdubbed her vocals.

Francis, who had studied Spanish in school, was fluent in the language which prompted her to perform the songs either entirely in Spanish or bilingual with a few lines sung in English.

The album was originally released in October 1960 under the catalogue numbers E-3853 (mono) and SE-3853 (stereo) on MGM Records. The album consisted of 13 songs, although 15 playbacks had been produced. First pressings of the album contain the complete intended listing of all 15 tracks on the cover, though actually the songs Amor and Aquellos ojos verdes were not released in the U. S. and at that time were only available on singles and EPs in Spain and South America.

Track listing

Side A

Side B

Not included songs from the sessions

References

External links
Official Connie Francis Fan Club Site

Connie Francis albums
1960 albums
Spanish-language albums
MGM Records albums
Albums conducted by Geoff Love